Liu Jing (born 1944) is a former Deputy Minister of Public Security of the People's Republic of China, and the former director of the 610 Office. He is also a high figure in two different offices of the Chinese government charged with dealing with subversive behaviors. Liu is originally from Yu County in Shanxi province. He received a degree in wireless systems and technology from the Beijing Institute of Technology.

Liu was a member of the 17th Central Committee of the Chinese Communist Party.

References

1944 births
Living people
People's Republic of China politicians from Shanxi
Chinese Communist Party politicians from Shanxi
Chinese police officers
Politicians from Yangquan